Gondwana University is a university established in 2011 in the city of Gadchiroli in Maharashtra state in central India. It is named after Gondwana region in central India.

History
On July 23, 2010, Maharashtra Legislative Assembly passed a unanimous resolution to constitute the Gondwana University, for the area comprising districts of Chandrapur and Gadchiroli. The resolution was moved by then Higher and Technical Education Minister Rajesh Tope. The new university was constituted by issuing notification under sub-section (2) of section 3 of the Maharashtra Universities Act, 1994. On 27 September 2011, Gondwana University was carved out of RTMNU, Nagpur. The official inauguration date was delayed until August 2012.

Jurisdiction
The university has jurisdiction over districts of Chandrapur and Gadchiroli in eastern Maharashtra.

Campus
The university has its campus in Gadchiroli city.

Faculties and Departments
The university has faculties of Arts, Science, Law, Social Science, Commerce, Home Science, Education and Medicine.

Departments

 Department of Computer 
 Department of Management 
 Department of Traditional
 Department of Science 
 Department of Engineering 
 Department of Paramedical
 Department of Vocational
 Department of Education
 Department of Commerce
 Department of Research

Affiliations
Its jurisdiction extends over 2 districts -Chandrapur,Gadricholi .

There are a total of 236 colleges affiliated to the university.

The prominent colleges affiliated to the university are Government College of Engineering, Chandrapur, Sardar Patel Mahavidyalaya, Chandrapur and Janata Mahavidyalaya, Chandrapur.

Vice chancellors

Vijay Ainchwar (2011-2013)
Shri. Ranjit Kumar IAS Collector and Vice-Chancellor (Acting)
Prof. Kirtiwardhan Dixit (Acting)
Dr. Murlidhar Chandekar (Acting)
Dr. Namdeo Venkatrao Kalyankar (2015-2020)
Dr. Srinivas Varkhedi (2020 - 9th Dec 2021)
Dr. Prashant S Bokare (10th Dec 2021 to till date)

References

External links
 

Universities in Maharashtra
Gadchiroli district
Educational institutions established in 2011
2011 establishments in Maharashtra